Sheiks in Bagdad is a 1925 American short silent comedy film directed by D. Ross Lederman, written and produced by Hal Roach. It stars Earl Mohan, Billy Engle, and Katherine Grant. It was Lederman's first directorial credit.

External links

1925 films
American silent short films
Films directed by D. Ross Lederman
1925 comedy films
Silent American comedy films
American black-and-white films
1925 short films
American comedy short films
1920s American films